In law, the bar is the legal profession as an institution. The term is a metonym for the line (or "bar") that separates the parts of a courtroom reserved for spectators and those reserved for participants in a trial such as lawyers.

In the United Kingdom, the term "the Bar" refers only to the professional organisation for  barristers (referred to in Scotland as advocates); the other type of UK lawyer, solicitors, have their own body, the Law Society. Correspondingly, being "called to the Bar" refers to admission to the profession of barristers, not solicitors.

Courtroom division

The origin of the term bar is from the barring furniture dividing a medieval European courtroom. In the US, Europe and many other countries referring to the law traditions of Europe, the area in front of the barrage is restricted to participants in the trial: the judge or judges, other court officials, the jury (if any), the lawyers for each party, the parties to the case, and witnesses giving testimony. The area behind the bar is open to the public. This restriction is enforced in nearly all courts. In most courts, the bar is represented by a physical partition: a railing or barrier that serves as a bar.

License and certification
The bar may also refer to the qualifying procedure by which a lawyer is licensed to practice law in a given jurisdiction.

U.S. procedure

In the United States, this procedure is administered by the individual U.S. states. In general, a candidate must graduate from a qualified law school and pass a written test: the bar examination. Almost all states use the Multistate Bar Examination (MBE), a multiple-choice exam administered on one day of a two- or three-day test, and an increasing number use the Uniform Bar Examination, which includes the MBE. In either case, on days during which the MBE is not administered, the bar exam may include questions related to that state's laws. The candidate is then admitted to the bar. A lawyer whose license to practice law is revoked is said to be disbarred.

U.S. patent procedure 

Admission to practice before the patent section of the United States Patent and Trademark Office (USPTO) requires that the individual pass a separate, single-day examination administered by that agency. This test is typically referred to as the "patent bar", although the word "bar" does not appear in the test's official name.

Unlike the general bar examination, for which graduation from a recognized law school is a prerequisite, the USPTO exam does not require that the candidate have taken any law school courses. Instead, the main prerequisite is a science or engineering background, most often met with a bachelor's degree in a relevant field. Individuals who pass the examination are referred to as "patent attorneys" if they have an active law license from any U.S. jurisdiction, and "patent agents" otherwise. Attorneys and agents have the same license to represent clients before the patent section of the USPTO, and both may issue patentability opinions. However, any other patent-related practice (such as licensing or infringement litigation) can only be performed by licensed attorneys—who do not necessarily have to be USPTO-licensed.

British procedure

In the United Kingdom, the practice of law is divided between barristers (referred to in Scotland as advocates) and solicitors. It is usually the former who appear in an advocacy role before the court. When a lawyer becomes an advocate or barrister, he/she is called to the bar.  In the UK, the bar is differentiated between the inner bar (for King's counsel) and the outer bar (for Junior barristers).

The legal profession
The bar commonly refers to the legal profession as a whole. With a modifier, it may refer to a branch or division of the profession: as, for instance, the tort bar—lawyers who specialize in filing civil suits for damages.

In conjunction with bench, bar may differentiate lawyers who represent clients (the bar) from judges or members of a judiciary (the bench). In this sense, the bar advocates and the bench adjudicates. Yet, in some countries, judges who previously worked as lawyers representing clients commonly remain members of the bar and lawyers are commonly referenced as Officers of the Court.

The phrase bench and bar denotes all judges and lawyers collectively.

See also
 Admission to practise law
 Admission to the bar in the United States
 Bar Association
 Bench (law)
 Call to the bar
 Courtroom

References

External links 

 Importance of Bar & Bench relationship, available at learningthelaw.in

Courts
Judiciaries